The Social and Economic Council (Dutch: Sociaal-Economische Raad, SER) is a major economic advisory council to the cabinet of the Netherlands. Formally it heads a system of sector-based regulatory organisations. It represents the social partners trade unions and employers' organisations. It forms the core organisation of the corporatist and social market economy known as the polder model and the main platform for social dialogue.

History
The SER was founded in 1950. It was founded after a long debate about the economic order of the Netherlands. The two main governing parties of the time, the Catholic People's Party (KVP) and the Labour Party (PvdA) had differing opinions on the subject. Both wanted to prevent the repetition of the Great Depression. The Labour Party preferred to grant the government an important regulatory role in the economy, while the KVP preferred to rely on the workings of a self-regulating market economy. A compromise was found in the corporatist model, in which both trade unions and employers' organisations would form sector-based regulatory organisations. The SER headed this structure and served as important partner for the national government. The SER was very important in the reconstruction of the Netherlands after the World War II.

In the 1950s and 60s, the SER was particularly successful in ensuring economic growth through close cooperation between government, trade unions and employers' organisations. In the 1970s, because of rising political polarisation and the 1973 oil crisis, the SER was unable to resolve economic problems. In the 1980s the SER returned to the centre of the economic policy making, as it was the platform for dialogue between  the government and its social partners. In the 1990s, the role of the SER began to change. The role of the sector-based regulatory organisations began to decline and the SER increasingly took the role of an advisory council of government; in 1997 the Senate and House of Representatives were granted the right to submit enquiry commissions to the SER.

Goals
The SER has three main goals for Dutch social-economic policy:
 To promote balanced and sustainable economic growth;
 To promote full employment;
 To promote a fair income distribution.

Organisation

The SER has thirty-three members. It consists of three sections, which each have eleven members in the council. These sections are trade unions, employers' organisations and government-appointed members, the so-called Crown members. The trade union members are appointed from the three major unions: FNV (8), CNV (2) and the MHP (1). The members of the employers' organisations are representatives from the three major employers' organisations: VNO-NCW (7), MKB (3) and the LTO (1). The government-appointed members are normally professors of economics or related fields and they include representatives of the Bureau for Economic Policy Analysis (CPB) and the central bank, De Nederlandsche Bank. The board of the SER is formed by four members of each section. The chair of the organisation is always a government appointee.

The SER heads and oversees the system of sector-based regulatory organisations. These organisations can like other governments, provinces, water boards etc. enforce legislation for their members, in this case companies. The SER is financed by levies which companies pay to the chambers of commerce. It spends €14 million a year.

Activities
The group has negotiated among other things, agreements in the textile sector, the banking sector and the gold sector. The SER also performs legal and administrative tasks. For example in the field of employee participation, healthy and safe working, employment inspections and pensions.

List of chairs of the Social and Economic Council

Current Members of the Social and Economic Council

Appointed Members of the Social and Economic Council

Trade associations Members of the Social and Economic Council

Trade union Members of the Social and Economic Council

See also
 Economic and Social Committee of the European Union.

External links
 SER official website

1950 establishments in the Netherlands
Business organisations based in the Netherlands
 
Dutch political institutions
 
 
Economy of the Netherlands
Government agencies established in 1950
Government-related professional associations
Labor in the Netherlands
 
Non-profit organisations based in the Netherlands
Industry in the Netherlands
Think tanks established in 1950
Think tanks based in the Netherlands
Scientific organizations established in 1950
Welfare in the Netherlands